Desolation Peak is in the North Cascade Mountains of Washington state, about  south of the Canada–United States border and in the Ross Lake National Recreation Area. It was first climbed in 1926 by Lage Wernstedt, who named it for the destruction caused by a forest fire that swept the slopes bare that same year. At the summit stands a small wooden one-room fire lookout belonging to the National Park Service.

Jack Kerouac spent 63 days during the summer of 1956 as a fire lookout on Desolation Peak. He wrote about his experiences in The Dharma Bums, Lonesome Traveler, Desolation Angels and in a collection of haiku by the name of "Desolation pops".

Desolation Peak Trail, is a steep hike to high meadows, great views and the fire lookout. It is a very popular hike but strenuous along the East Bank Trail. The trail is often hot and dry.

In 2020 Lindsay Hagen published a short film about Jim Henterley, one of the watchmen remaining in service on the Desolation Peak Lookout.

Climate

Desolation Peak is located in the marine west coast climate zone of western North America. Most weather fronts originate in the Pacific Ocean, and travel northeast toward the Cascade Mountains. As fronts approach the North Cascades, they are forced upward by the peaks of the Cascade Range, causing them to drop their moisture in the form of rain or snowfall onto the Cascades (Orographic lift). As a result, the west side of the North Cascades experiences high precipitation, especially during the winter months in the form of snowfall. During winter months, weather is usually cloudy, but, due to high-pressure systems over the Pacific Ocean which intensify during summer months, there is often little or no cloud cover during the summer.

Geology

The North Cascades features some of the most rugged topography in the Cascade Range with craggy peaks, spires, ridges, and deep glacial valleys. Geological events occurring many years ago created the diverse topography and drastic elevation changes over the Cascade Range leading to the various climate differences.

The history of the formation of the Cascade Mountains dates back millions of years ago to the late Eocene Epoch. With the North American Plate overriding the Pacific Plate, episodes of volcanic igneous activity persisted.  In addition, small fragments of the oceanic and continental lithosphere called terranes created the North Cascades about 50 million years ago. 

During the Pleistocene period dating back over two million years ago, glaciation advancing and retreating repeatedly scoured the landscape leaving deposits of rock debris. The "U"-shaped cross section of the river valleys are a result of recent glaciation. Uplift and faulting in combination with glaciation have been the dominant processes which have created the tall peaks and deep valleys of the North Cascades area.

References

External links
 

North Cascades of Washington (state)
Mountains of Whatcom County, Washington
Mountains of Washington (state)